Gerard William "Jerry" Ford (October 2, 1924 – August 24, 2008) was an American businessman who in 1946 founded Ford Modeling Agency with his wife Eileen Ford in their apartment on the Upper East Side of Manhattan in New York City.

Life 
Ford was born October 2, 1924, in New Orleans, Louisiana.  One of six children of John William and Ermine Ford, Ford graduated from Jesuit High School in New Orleans where he played football and became a boxer and football player at Notre Dame (his roommate was Johnny Lujack, a Heisman Trophy winner), before transferring to midshipman school at Columbia University as part of his service with the United States Navy during World War II.  His wife, then Eileen Otte, was studying at Barnard College and was, herself, briefly a model. The couple met and eloped in 1944 while Ford was waiting to ship out with the Navy.

Career 
In 1945, after completing his Naval service aboard a supply ship based in the Pacific Theater of Operations, Ford returned to his home and wife in New York.  He resumed his studies in accounting at Columbia University, while Mrs. Ford worked as a secretary for several of her friends, also models, and eventually became their informal agent.  When she became pregnant, she left active work and he stepped in to manage the business.

Prior to Ford's innovations, models generally handled their own bookings and billing individually. In the 1970s, Ford created the first contracts for models to represent specific brands exclusively, securing higher fees for the models. He negotiated the first such contract for Lauren Hutton to represent Revlon in 1974.

At the time of his death, he resided in Oldwick, New Jersey. He died in Morristown, New Jersey at the age of 83.  The cause of his death was complications from endocarditis.

His daughter is Katie Ford.

References 

1924 births
2008 deaths
United States Navy personnel of World War II
People from Tewksbury Township, New Jersey
Notre Dame Fighting Irish football players
Columbia University School of General Studies alumni
20th-century American businesspeople
Deaths from endocarditis
Players of American football from New Orleans